Amanda Righetti (born April 4, 1983) is an American actress. She is known for her role as Grace Van Pelt on The Mentalist, as well as her roles in Friday the 13th, The O.C. and Colony.

Early life
The youngest of eight children, Righetti was born on April 4, 1983, in St. George, Utah, and raised in Nevada, outside Las Vegas. Her father, Alexander Dominic Righetti, is of Italian descent, while her mother, Linda Carol Chisum, is of German, French and English descent.

Career
Righetti started modeling at age 14, then she moved to Los Angeles at age 18 to start her acting career. After securing a role in the pilot for a proposed series by the name of No Place Like Home, she played a recurring character in the teen drama The O.C., was a regular in the primetime soap opera North Shore and in late 2005, Righetti starred in Fox's drama series Reunion. Other credits include a recurring role on K-Ville, guest roles on CSI: Crime Scene Investigation and Entourage and a role in the television film Romy and Michele: In the Beginning.

In 2006, Righetti signed on to star as the female lead in horror sequel Return to House on Haunted Hill. The film was released direct-to-video in October 2007. In April 2008, she was cast as the female lead in the slasher film Friday the 13th (2009). Production ended in June 2008 and the film was released in theaters on February 13, 2009. Also that year, Righetti was signed to the CBS series The Mentalist, in the role of Grace Van Pelt. Her 2012 to 2013 pregnancy was not reflected in her character's storyline, during which she was filmed using selective angles and largely limited to desk duty.

In September 2011, Righetti signed with talent agency UTA.

Righetti left The Mentalist after season six.

Righetti starred as a divorced novelist in the Hallmark Channel television film Love at the Shore (2017).

Personal life
Righetti married director and writer Jordan Alan on April 29, 2006, on the Hawaiian island of Oahu. They have a son, born in 2013. Righetti filed for divorce in 2017.

Filmography

Film

Television

Awards
 2009 New York Independent International Film and Video Festival: Best Actress in a Short Film – Amanda Righetti in Matter

References

External links
 
 

1983 births
Actresses from Nevada
Actresses from Utah
American child actresses
American film actresses
American television actresses
American people of Italian descent
Living people
People from Clark County, Nevada
People from St. George, Utah
20th-century American actresses
21st-century American actresses